The pectineal line of the pubis  (also pecten pubis) is a ridge on the superior ramus of the pubic bone. It forms part of the pelvic brim.

Lying across from the pectineal line are fibers of the pectineal ligament, and the proximal origin of the pectineus muscle.

In combination with the arcuate line, it makes the iliopectineal line.

References

External links
 

Bones of the pelvis
Pubis (bone)